Mark Teschner is an American casting director.

Career
A native New Yorker, Mark Teschner has been the Casting Director of ABC Daytime's General Hospital since 1989. He has been described by Rolling Stone magazine as "an actor's casting director" and TV Guide noted his "unparalleled track record for finding top new talent." For his work on General Hospital he has received nine Emmy Awards and an additional 8 nominations. He is also a seven time recipient of the Casting Society of America's Artios Award and has received 16 additional nominations. He is a former vice president of the Casting Society of America and a former Governor for the Television Academy.

Education
Cum Laude Graduate, Connecticut College, B.A. in English.
Mark attended the National Theater Institute at the Eugene O'Neill Theater Center in the fall of 1978.

Appearances
Numerous appearances including The Art Of Casting and E! Channel's Fight for Fame.

Casting director credits

TV
General Hospital (1989–present)
General Hospital: Night Shift (2007–2008)
Port Charles (1997–2003)
Seven Girlfriends

Broadway
Teddy & Alice
Oh! Coward
Corpse

Pre-Broadway
The Apprenticeship of Duddy Kravitz
Liberties Taken

Off-Broadway
A...My Name is Alice
Voyage of the Beagle
Transposed Heads
Rap Master Ronnie
Little Victories
Territorial Rites
The Only Woman General
Still Life
Goodbye Freddy
Green Fields
Paducah
December Seventh
1984
Just So!

Regional Theater
Camping with Henry and Tom
The 24th Day
Many Thousands Gone
Tonight We Improvise
Sweet Table at the Richelieu
Year of the Duck
Fatal Attraction
Chekov in Yalta
Wetter than Water
A Walk out of the Water
A Portable Pioneer and Prairie Show

Awards and nominations
Daytime Emmy Award
Win: 2006, 2007, 2008, 2010, 2011, 2013, 2014, 2016, 2018 Casting, General Hospital
Nomination: 2002, 2003, 2005, 2007, 2008, 2009, 2012 , 2015 Casting, General Hospital

Casting Society of America
Nomination: 1992–1995, 1997–2000, 2000–2010, 2012 Casting, General Hospital
Win: 1996, 2001, 2002, 2009, 2010, 2013, 2014, 2015 Casting, General Hospital
Nomination: 1998, 2001, Casting, Port Charles
Nomination: 2000, Casting, Seven Girlfriends (movie)

External links
Variety Article

www.markteschner.com

References

Year of birth missing (living people)
Connecticut College alumni
American television directors
American casting directors
Living people